The Telkom PGA Pro-Am was a golf tournament on the Sunshine Tour. It was founded in 2005 and is played at the Centurion Country Club in Tshwane, South Africa.

Winners

References

External links
Sunshine Tour

Former Sunshine Tour events
Golf tournaments in South Africa
Sport in Gauteng
Recurring sporting events established in 2005
Recurring sporting events disestablished in 2013
City of Tshwane Metropolitan Municipality